

Offseason 
 October 21, 1983: Brett Butler and Brook Jacoby were sent to the Indians by the Atlanta Braves to complete an earlier deal (the Indians traded Len Barker to the Braves for players to be named later and $150,000, and received Rick Behenna from the Braves on September 2) made on August 28, 1983.
 December 5, 1983: Kelly Gruber was drafted from the Indians by the Toronto Blue Jays in the 1983 rule 5 draft.
 January 14, 1984: DeWayne Buice was signed as a free agent by the Indians.
 February 5, 1984: Toby Harrah and a player to be named later were traded by the Indians to the New York Yankees for Otis Nixon, George Frazier and a player to be named later. The Indians and Yankees completed the deal on February 8, with the Indians sending Rick Browne (minors) to the Yankees and the Yankees sending Guy Elston (minors) to the Indians.

Regular season

Season standings

Record vs. opponents

Notable transactions 
 April 6, 1984: Jerry Ujdur was signed as a free agent by the Indians.
 April 7, 1984: DeWayne Buice was released by the Indians.
 May 8, 1984: Geno Petralli was purchased by the Indians from the Toronto Blue Jays.
 June 4, 1984: Cory Snyder was drafted by the Indians in the 1st round (4th pick) of the 1984 Major League Baseball draft.
 June 13, 1984: Rick Sutcliffe, George Frazier and Ron Hassey were traded by the Indians to the Chicago Cubs for Mel Hall, Joe Carter, Don Schulze, and Darryl Banks (minors).
 June 21, 1984: Dan Spillner was traded by the Indians to the Chicago White Sox for a player to be named later. The White Sox completed the deal by sending Jim Siwy to the Indians on June 26.
 September 24, 1984: Jamie Quirk was purchased by the Indians from the Chicago White Sox.

Opening Day Lineup

Roster

Game log

Regular season

|-style=background:#cfc
| 16 || April 27 || 7:35p.m. EST || @ Tigers || 8–4  || Aponte (1–0) || Abbott (1–1) || – || 5:44 || 34,112 || 10–6 || W5
|-style=background:#fbb
| 17 || April 28 || 2:15p.m. EST || @ Tigers || 2–6 || Morris (5–0) || Behenna (0–1) || – || 2:25 || 28,253 || 10–7 || L1
|-style=background:#fbb
| 18 || April 29 || 1:35p.m. EDT || @ Tigers || 1–6 || Petry (3–1) || Spillner (0–1) || – || 2:20 || 24,853 || 10–8 || L2
|-

|-style=background:#fbb
| 22 || May 4 || 7:05p.m. EDT || Tigers || 2–9 || Petry (4–1) || Spillner (0–2) || Hernández (3) || 3:06 || 8,497 || 11–11 || L1
|-style=background:#fbb
| 23 || May 5 || 1:35p.m. EDT || Tigers || 5–6 || Abbott (2–1) || Heaton (2–3) || López (2) || 2:57 || 9,282 || 11–12 || L2
|-style=background:#fbb
| 24 || May 6 || 1:55p.m. EDT || Tigers || 5–6  || López (3–0) || Camacho (0–2) || – || 4:20 || 16,125 || 11–13 || L3
|-style=background:#fff
| 29 || May 13
|-

|-

|-style=background:#bbbfff
|colspan="12"|55th All-Star Game in San Francisco, CA
|-style=background:#fbb
| 96 || July 23 || 7:05p.m. EDT || Tigers || 1–4 || Morris (13–6) || Blyleven (9–4) || Bair (4) || 3:09 || 16,576 || 41–54–1 || L1
|-style=background:#fbb
| 97 || July 24 || 7:05p.m. EDT || Tigers || 5–9 || Wilcox (10–6) || Farr (1–7) || – || 3:21 || 15,578 || 41–55–1 || L2
|-style=background:#cfc
| 98 || July 25 || 7:05p.m. EDT || Tigers || 4–1 || Smith (4–2) || Rozema (7–2) || Camacho (12) || 2:48 || 15,516 || 42–55–1 || W1
|-style=background:#bbb
| — || July 26 || || Tigers || colspan=8 | Postponed (Rain; Site change) (Makeup date: July 31)
|-style=background:#fbb
| 102 || July 31 || 5:35p.m. EDT || @ Tigers || 1–5 || Berenguer (5–7) || Smith (4–3) || – || 2:30 || N/A || 43–58–1 || L2
|-style=background:#cfc
| 103 || July 31 || 8:45p.m. EDT || @ Tigers || 6–4 || Heaton (8–10) || Rozema (7–3) || Waddell (5) || 2:50 || 32,158 || 44–58–1 || W1
|-

|-style=background:#cfc
| 104 || August 1 || 7:35p.m. EDT || @ Tigers || 4–2 || Farr (2–7) || Petry (14–5) || Camacho (13) || 2:46 || 27,271 || 45–58–1 || W2
|-style=background:#fbb
| 105 || August 2 || 1:30p.m. EDT || @ Tigers || 1–2 || Morris (14–7) || Blyleven (10–5) || Hernández (22) || 2:39 || 28,700 || 45–59–1 || L1
|-

|-

|- style="text-align:center;"
| Legend:       = Win       = Loss       = PostponementBold = Indians team member

Player stats

Batting
Note: G = Games played; AB = At bats; R = Runs scored; H = Hits; 2B = Doubles; 3B = Triples; HR = Home runs; RBI = Runs batted in; AVG = Batting average; SB = Stolen bases

Pitching
Note: W = Wins; L = Losses; ERA = Earned run average; G = Games pitched; GS = Games started; SV = Saves; IP = Innings pitched; R = Runs allowed; ER = Earned runs allowed; BB = Walks allowed; K = Strikeouts

Awards and honors 

All-Star Game

Farm system

Notes

References 
 1984 Cleveland Indians at Baseball Reference
 1984 Cleveland Indians at Baseball Almanac

Cleveland Guardians seasons
Cleveland Indians season
Cleve